Thomas Edward "Lefty" George (August 13, 1886 – May 13, 1955) was a Major League Baseball pitcher who played for four seasons. He played for the St. Louis Browns in 1911, the Cleveland Naps in 1912, the Cincinnati Reds in 1915, and the Boston Braves in 1918.

External links

1886 births
1955 deaths
Major League Baseball pitchers
St. Louis Browns players
Cleveland Naps players
Cincinnati Reds players
Boston Braves players
East Liverpool (minor league baseball) players
York White Roses players
Montgomery Climbers players
Indianapolis Indians players
Toledo Mud Hens players
Cleveland Bearcats players
Kansas City Blues (baseball) players
New Orleans Pelicans (baseball) players
Columbus Senators players
Minneapolis Millers (baseball) players
York Bees players
Washington and Lee Generals baseball players
Baseball players from Pittsburgh